Dark Tide is a 2012 American action horror thriller film directed by John Stockwell, produced by Jeanette Buerling (aka Jeanette B. Milio) and Matthew E. Chausse and written by Ronnie Christensen and Amy Sorlie. The film is based on a story by Amy Sorlie and stars Halle Berry, Olivier Martinez, and Ralph Brown. The film was a critical failure and a box-office bomb.

Plot
Kate is a shark expert whose business has been failing since a shark attack killed a fellow diver under her command. Once dubbed "the shark whisperer", Kate is haunted by the memory of the attack and unable to get back into the water. With bills piling up and the bank about to foreclose on Kate's boat, Kate's estranged husband, Jeff, presents her with a lucrative opportunity: to lead a thrill-seeking millionaire businessman and his teenage son on a dangerous shark dive - outside the cage. Battling her self-doubts and fear, Kate accepts the proposal and sets a course for the world's deadliest feeding ground, "Shark Alley".

Cast
 Halle Berry as Kate Mathieson
 Olivier Martinez as Jeff Mathieson
 Ralph Brown as William Brady
 Luke Tyler as Luke Brady
 Mark Elderkin as Tommy Phillips
 Sizwe Msutu as Themba
 Thoko Ntshinga as Zukie

Production
Production began in July 2010 in False Bay, Cape Town, South Africa, and shot for six weeks on a small boat with real great white sharks. The production then moved to the UK for three weeks filming in Pinewood Studios on the underwater stage and at Black Hangar Studios on their external water tank. The soundtrack was written and performed by Mark Sayfritz.

Reception
On Rotten Tomatoes, the film has a rare approval rating of 0% based on reviews from 20 critics, with an average rating of 2.59/10. The site's critical consensus reads: "Shallow and brackish, Dark Tide fails to rise". On Metacritic it has a score of 23% based on reviews from 4 critics, indicating "generally unfavorable reviews".

See also
 List of killer shark films

References

External links
 
 Dark Tide at BlackFilm.com

2012 films
2012 action thriller films
American action thriller films
British action thriller films
Films set in South Africa
Films set in Cape Town
Films about shark attacks
Films directed by John Stockwell
Films about sharks
2010s English-language films
2010s American films
2010s British films